Javier Tetes (born May 29, 1983 in Montevideo) is a Uruguayan footballer who played for Central Español in the Uruguayan Segunda División.

Teams
  Miramar Misiones 2006-2009
  Boston River 2009-2010
  Bella Vista 2010
  Santiago Wanderers 2011
  Central Español 2011–2013

References
 Profile at BDFA 

1983 births
Living people
Uruguayan footballers
Uruguayan expatriate footballers
Miramar Misiones players
Boston River players
C.A. Bella Vista players
Santiago Wanderers footballers
Expatriate footballers in Chile

Association football defenders